Metallo is a character appearing in DC Comics.

Metallo may also refer to:

 Metallo (Arrowverse Earth-X), a version of the character appearing in the Arrowverse
 "Metallo" (Lois & Clark episode), an episode of Lois & Clark: The New Adventures of Superman
 Metallo (Smallville character), the version of the character appearing in the TV series Smallville
 "Metallo" (Smallville episode), an episode of Smallville
 Metallo (The Batman), the version of the character appearing in the TV series The Batman